William Brinkley (1917–1993) was an American writer and journalist.

William Brinkley may also refer to:

 William Brinkley (Underground Railroad), American conductor on the network that guided enslaved people to freedom in the Northern United States or Canada
 William R. Brinkley, American cellular biologist and scientific advocate